Janine Monterrain (born 3 April 1942) is a French alpine skier. She competed in two events at the 1960 Winter Olympics.

References

1942 births
Living people
French female alpine skiers
Olympic alpine skiers of France
Alpine skiers at the 1960 Winter Olympics
Sportspeople from Haute-Savoie